This is a discography of Die Fledermaus, an operetta by Johann Strauss II, which was first performed on 5 April 1874 at the Theater an der Wien in Vienna.

Recordings

References

Recordings of Die Fledermaus on operadis-opera-discography.org.uk

Opera discographies
Fledermaus Discography